The 1918 Massachusetts gubernatorial election was held on November 4, 1918.

Republican primary

Governor

Candidates
Calvin Coolidge, incumbent Lieutenant Governor

Declined
Samuel W. McCall, incumbent Governor (to run for U.S. Senate)

Lieutenant Governor Coolidge was unopposed for the Republican nomination.

Results

Lieutenant Governor

Candidates
Channing H. Cox, Speaker of the Massachusetts House of Representatives
Guy Andrews Ham, former Governor's Councilor and candidate for Lieutenant Governor in 1915

Declined
Edwin U. Curtis, former Mayor of Boston
Alvan T. Fuller, United States Representative

Results

Democratic primary

Governor

Candidates
Edward P. Barry, former Lieutenant Governor
William A. Gaston, nominee for Governor in 1902 and 1903
Richard H. Long, Framingham businessman

Withdrew
Frederick Mansfield, former Treasurer and Receiver-General of Massachusetts and nominee for Governor in 1916 and 1917 (endorsed Gaston)

Results

Lieutenant Governor

Candidates
Joseph H. O'Neil, former United States Representative

O'Neil was unopposed for the Democratic nomination.

General election

Candidates
Calvin Coolidge, incumbent Lieutenant Governor (Republican)
Richard H. Long, car dealer from Framingham (Democratic)
Sylvester McBride (Socialist)
Ingvar Paulsen (Socialist Labor)

Results

See also
 1918 Massachusetts legislature

References

Bibliography
 

Governor
1918
Massachusetts
November 1918 events
Calvin Coolidge